The Canterbury Museum is a museum located in the central city of Christchurch, New Zealand, in the city's Cultural Precinct. The museum was established in 1867 with Julius von Haast – whose collection formed its core – as its first director. The building is registered as a "Historic Place  – Category I" by Heritage New Zealand.

Directors
The title curator and director has been used interchangeably during the history of Canterbury Museum. Von Haast was the museum's inaugural director; Haast died in 1887. Following Haast's death, Frederick Hutton was acting director until Henry Ogg Forbes took on a permanent position in December 1888 upon his return from England. In August 1892, Forbes permanently moved to England, and Hutton was appointed full director from May 1892 until October 1905. Hutton applied for leave to travel to England, and Charles Chilton was acting director from March 1905; Hutton died on his return journey from England and Chilton retained his acting role until April 1906, when Edgar Ravenswood Waite received a permanent appointment. Waite was director for eight years until March 1914, when he took the equivalent role at the South Australian Museum.

Robert Speight, who had already been acting director in 1911, was appointed as Waite's successor in March 1914. Speight retired from this role in November 1935. Speight was succeeded by two acting directors who worked alongside one another; the geologist Robin Allan, and the zoologist Edgar Percival. They were succeeded by Robert Falla, who commenced his role on 1 March 1937 and who was director until 1947, when he accepted the same position at the Dominion Museum in Wellington. Walter Reginald Brock Oliver was acting director from November  1947 to September 1948. Roger Duff, who had been acting director on several occasions during Falla's tenure prior to Oliver, succeeded Falla as director from September 1948 until his sudden death on 30 October 1978. John Crum Wilson succeeded Duff as acting director from October 1978 to February 1979, and then as full director until February 1983. The archaeologist Michael Malthus Trotter succeeded him as director from March 1983 to December 1995. Stephen Phillips had an interim position from January to March 1996 until the current director, Anthony Wright, was appointed in March 1996.

Construction
The building, a  Gothic Revival constructed on a design by Benjamin Mountfort, opened in 1870. Two years after its opening, the single-storey building was expanded with an additional floor in the  Victorian Gothic style. The museum continued to grow over the next decade, with an addition built on in 1876 and an interior courtyard roofed in 1882. In 1958, a new wing was added adjacent to  Christ's College, and another was built on in 1977. The building was strengthened in the mid-1990s and a four-storey block was added in 1995. The museum will be restored and expanded. The Robert McDougall Art Gallery will be used by the Museum.

Earthquake impact
The museum sustained minor damage to its façade during the February 2011 Christchurch earthquake, but remains structurally sound. This can perhaps be attributed to the progressive strengthening and renovating of the buildings to earthquake standards between 1987 and 1995.  An estimated 95% of the collections were unharmed. The statue of William Rolleston, located at the front of the museum, toppled off its plinth during the quake. The museum reopened on 2 September 2011.

Gallery

See also
Canterbury Spur, a flat-topped ridge leading north from the north face of Mount Glossopteris named after the museum.

References

External links

 Assorted Photographs of the Canterbury Museum
 Canterbury Museum website
 A History of the Canterbury Museum
 Christchurch City Libraries' Article on the Canterbury Museum
 Records of the Canterbury Museum

Museums established in 1867
Infrastructure completed in 1882
Museums in Christchurch
Natural history museums in New Zealand
Textile museums
Heritage New Zealand Category 1 historic places in Canterbury, New Zealand
1867 establishments in New Zealand
Art museums and galleries in Christchurch
History museums in New Zealand
Benjamin Mountfort buildings
Terminating vistas in New Zealand
1870s architecture in New Zealand
Gothic Revival architecture in New Zealand